Packard Motor Car Showroom and Storage Facility is a historic automobile showroom located at Buffalo in Erie County, New York.  It is a three-story, reinforced concrete frame structure with restrained Neo-classical detailing.  It was designed by Albert Kahn in about 1926 and served as a Packard dealership for 30 years.

It was listed on the National Register of Historic Places in 2006.

See also
 Packard Motor Car Dealership (Dayton, Ohio)
 Packard Motor Car Dealership (Philadelphia)

References

External links

Packard Motor Car Showroom and Storage Facility - U.S. National Register of Historic Places on Waymarking.com
Preservation Studios Buffalo, NY: historic building rehabilitation and preservation consultants

Buildings and structures in Buffalo, New York
Commercial buildings on the National Register of Historic Places in New York (state)
Neoclassical architecture in New York (state)
Commercial buildings completed in 1927
Packard
Auto dealerships on the National Register of Historic Places
National Register of Historic Places in Buffalo, New York
Transportation buildings and structures on the National Register of Historic Places in New York (state)